Helena–West Helena is the county seat of and the largest city within Phillips County, Arkansas, United States. The current city was consolidated, effective January 1, 2006, from the two Arkansas cities of Helena and West Helena.  Helena is sited on lowlands between the Mississippi River and the eastern side of Crowley's Ridge. West Helena is located on the western side of Crowley's Ridge, a geographic anomaly in the typically flat Arkansas Delta.  The Helena Bridge, one of Arkansas' four Mississippi River bridges, carries U.S. Route 49 across to Mississippi. The combined population of the two cities was 15,012 at the 2000 census and at the 2010 census, the official population was 12,282.

The municipality traces its historical roots to the founding of the port town of Helena on the Mississippi River by European Americans in 1833. As the county seat, Helena was the center of a prosperous cotton plantation region in the antebellum years. Helena was occupied by the Union Army early in the American Civil War. The city was the site of the Battle of Helena fought in 1863. Confederate forces unsuccessfully tried to expel Union forces from Helena in order to help relieve pressure on the strategic river town of Vicksburg, Mississippi. Later in the year, Helena served as the launching point for the Union Army in the capture of Little Rock, the state capital.

A thriving blues community developed here in the 1940s and 1950s as rural musicians relocated for city jobs. Mechanization had reduced the need for farm workers. The city continued to grow until the closing of the Mohawk Rubber Company, a subsidiary of Yokohama Rubber Company, in the 1970s. Unemployment surged shortly after.

Among the attractions in Helena–West Helena are the Delta Cultural Center, the Pillow-Thompson House (owned and operated by the Phillips Community College of the University of Arkansas), and the Helena Confederate Cemetery, which holds the remains of seven Confederate Army generals. The city holds an annual King Biscuit Blues Festival each October. It has been held under this name since 2010, when it was renamed at a 25th-anniversary performance by musician B.B. King.

History

The city of Helena was founded by European Americans in 1833, as a port along the Mississippi River. Crowleys Ridge provided elevation and some protection against flooding, a rare feature along the right/west bank of the lower Mississippi River.

During the Civil War, the Union Army occupied Helena prior to the Battle of Helena in 1863. In the early morning hours of July 4, 1863, Confederate forces attempted to retake Helena in order to help relieve pressure on the strategic river town of Vicksburg, Mississippi. Confederate forces in Vicksburg had already arranged to surrender to General U.S. Grant on the morning of July 4. Many of the former battle sites are still intact. Helena may benefit from developing and protecting these historic areas for destination tourism.

18-year-old William Turner was lynched in Helena, Phillips County, Arkansas on November 18, 1921. He was shot dead, dragged to the little city park, doused with gasoline and set on fire.

Prior to consolidation, Helena contained 6,323 people within 23.1 km.  Neighboring West Helena had 8,689 people in 11.5 km. Merger proposals began as early as 2002, and a March 2005 vote among citizens of both cities approved the merger.  The surrounding rural county is one of the poorest of Arkansas' 75 counties.  Proponents of the consolidation said that combining the cities would strengthen their bargaining power for the surrounding region in competing for projects to improve the overall economy and standard of living. Among the combined city's council's first tasks was the hiring of a new police chief. They chose Vincent Bell.

Musical history
In the 1940s and 1950s, Helena attracted blacks from rural Arkansas and the Mississippi Delta, who came for the jobs. Some also worked full-time as musicians. By then Helena was 70% black, and juke joints employed such blues pianist as Sunnyland Slim, Memphis Slim and Roosevelt Sykes.

In November 1941, a white businessman put together the staff for the town's first radio station KFFA. A group of blues musicians were given a one-hour radio spot on the condition that they gain a sponsor. King Biscuit Flour agreed to do. The King Biscuit Entertainers were sponsored, as well as the show King Biscuit Time, featuring blues musicians.

The King Biscuit Blues Festival was organized in the late 20th century as an annual October event. It was renamed as the Arkansas Blues and Heritage Festival in 2005, and is one of the largest blues festivals in the world. The celebration is held in downtown Helena on Cherry Street in early October. It was renamed in 2010 as the King Biscuit Blues Festival at a 25th anniversary performance of renowned musician B.B. King.

The lyrics of "Stand Up Guy" by Mark Knopfler make reference to West Helena.

Demographics

2020 census

As of the 2020 United States Census, there were 9,519 people, 4,191 households, and 2,515 families residing in the city.

2000 census
Based on U.S. Census reports for both cities prior to the merger, the 2000 population of the area comprising Helena–West Helena was 15,012. There were 5,516 households, and 3,765 families residing in the city. The racial makeup of the city was 66.63% African American, 31.85% White, 0.19% Native American, 0.47% Asian, 0.01% Pacific Islander, 0.27% from other races, and 0.58% from two or more races. Hispanics or Latinos of any race were 0.89% of the population.

The median income for a household in the city was $19,896, and the median income for a family was $23,274. Males had a median income of $25,087 versus $17,238 for females. The per capita income for the city was $12,131.

Helena

The city of Helena was founded by European Americans in 1833, as a port along the Mississippi River.

As of the census of 2000, there were 6,323 people, 2,312 households, and 1,542 families residing in the city of Helena. The racial makeup of the city was 67.93% Black or African American, 30.59% White, 0.13% Native American, 0.60% Asian, 0.17% from other races, and 0.59% from two or more races. Hispanic or Latino of any race were 0.73% of the population.

There were 2,312 households, out of which 32.7% had children under the age of 18 living with them, 33.8% were married couples living together, 28.5% had a female householder with no husband present, and 33.3% were non-families. 30.0% of all households were made up of individuals, and 13.4% had someone living alone who was 65 years of age or older. The average household size was 2.62 and the average family size was 3.28.

In the city, the population was spread out, with 32.5% under the age of 18, 10.0% from 18 to 24, 22.1% from 25 to 44, 20.0% from 45 to 64, and 15.5% who were 65 years of age or older. The median age was 32 years. For every 100 females there were 83.3 males. For every 100 females age 18 and over, there were 75.5 males.

The median income for a household in the city was $18,662, and the median income for a family was $21,534. Males had a median income of $27,203 versus $17,250 for females. The per capita income for the city was $13,028. About 38.4% of families and 41.4% of the population were below the poverty line, including 54.9% of those under age 18 and 24.1% of those age 65 or over.

West Helena
As of the census of 2000, there were 8,689 people, 3,204 households, and 2,223 families residing in the city of West Helena. The racial makeup of the city was 65.69% Black or African American, 32.77% White, 0.23% Native American, 0.38% Asian, 0.02% Pacific Islander, 0.33% from other races, and 0.58% from two or more races. Hispanic or Latino of any race were 1.01% of the population.

There were 3,204 households, out of which 36.0% had children under the age of 18 living with them, 36.8% were married couples living together, 29.2% had a female householder with no husband present, and 30.6% were non-families. 27.6% of all households were made up of individuals, and 11.5% had someone living alone who was 65 years of age or older.  The average household size was 2.71 and the average family size was 3.32.

In the city, the population was spread out, with 34.1% under the age of 18, 10.1% from 18 to 24, 23.9% from 25 to 44, 19.6% from 45 to 64, and 12.3% who were 65 years of age or older.  The median age was 30 years. For every 100 females there were 80.7 males.  For every 100 females age 18 and over, there were 71.5 males.

The median income for a household in the city was $21,130, and the median income for a family was $25,014. Males had a median income of $22,971 versus $17,225 for females. The per capita income for the city was $11,234.  About 30.9% of families and 35.4% of the population were below the poverty line, including 49.5% of those under age 18 and 27.2% of those age 65 or over.

Economy
With a median income of $19,896 for a household, the city is one of the poorest in the nation. One potential advance for the combined city, as reported by the Arkansas Democrat-Gazette on July 12, 2006, is an ethanol fuel refinery to be built by Las Vegas-based E-Fuels.  Whether the consolidation had any bearing on the decision is not certain. If the project is developed, it is expected to bring several new jobs and a significant increase in traffic to the region's port on the Mississippi River.

In 2006, the city announced plans to reopen the regional landfill, from which Helena–West Helena could earn fees.

Helena–West Helena's chief economic base continues to be agriculture, specifically cotton cultivation. Mechanization and large industrial farms have reduced the need for farm labor since the first half of the 20th century. Barge traffic at the city's port on the Mississippi River is another source of jobs and revenues, in addition to retail and tourism.

Media
The Helena-West Helena World is the local newspaper.

Education

Higher education
 Phillips Community College of the University of Arkansas
Public education
The Helena–West Helena School District operates public schools.
 Central High School - Grades 7–12 high school, located in West Helena. 
 J.F. Wahl Elementary School - Grades K–6 elementary school, located in Helena.
KIPP: Delta Public Schools operates a group of charter schools in the municipality.
 KIPP: Elementary Literacy Academy (grades K–4)
KIPP: Delta College Preparatory School (grades 5–8)
 KIPP: Delta Collegiate High School (grades 9–12)
Private education
 DeSoto School (K through 12).
Helena previously had a Catholic grade school for black children, St. Cyprian School; it closed in 1963.

Notable people
John Hanks Alexander - second African-American West Point graduate
Fred Childress - all-star football player in Canadian Football League
Patrick Cleburne - Confederate Civil War general
Ken Hatfield - college football coach at Clemson, Air Force, Arkansas, and Rice
Levon Helm - musician, member of The Band
Alex Johnson, Major League Baseball player
Mary Lambert, music video director
Blanche Lincoln, U.S. senator from Arkansas
Robert Lockwood, Jr., blues musician and stepson of Robert Johnson
Robert Lee McCollum, blues musician
John Stroger, Jr., longtime president of the Board of Commissioners of Cook County, Illinois
Roosevelt Sykes - blues pianist
Conway Twitty (born Harold Lloyd Jenkins), country music star who grew up in Helena from the age of 10 when his family moved from Friars Point, Mississippi.
Ellis Valentine - former Major League Baseball player
Sonny Boy Williamson II, blues musician
Richard Wright, author of fiction and autobiography, including his novel  Native Son and memoir Black Boy

References

External links

 
 Helena–West Helena City Council
 Delta Dreams, A PBS Documentary of the story of Helena–West Helena told by residents of Helena – men and women, young and old, who live and work in the community.
 Main Street Helena, Downtown Helena
 Helena Civil War Archives, information about the civil war in Helena

Cities in Phillips County, Arkansas
Cities in Arkansas
Inland port cities and towns of the United States
Arkansas populated places on the Mississippi River
Populated places established in 2006
County seats in Arkansas